Botswana is divided into 10 districts
Central District
Ghanzi District
Kgalagadi District
Kgatleng District
Kweneng District
North-East District
North-West District
South-East District
Southern District
Chobe District (Separated from North-West District)

 
Botswana
Botswana